Karin Lowachee is a Guyanese-born Canadian author of speculative fiction.

Lowachee is the author of four novels, Warchild (2002), Burndive (2003), Cagebird (2005) and The Gaslight Dogs (2010). Warchild, which uses second-person point of view for the first several chapters of the novel, won the Warner Aspect First Novel Award. Cagebird won the 2006 Gaylactic Spectrum Awards and the Prix Aurora Award, and was a finalist for the 2005 Philip K. Dick Award. Her fourth novel, The Gaslight Dogs, was released in April 2010.

Bibliography

Novels
 Warchild (2002)
 Burndive (2003)
 Cagebird (2005)
 The Gaslight Dogs (2010)

Short stories
 "Culture Shock," ON SPEC: The Canadian Magazine of Speculative Writing (1994)
 "The Forgotten Ones," So Long Been Dreaming: Postcolonial Science Fiction & Fantasy (2004), edited by Uppinder Mehan & Nalo Hopkinson
 "This Ink Feels Like Sorrow," Mythspring: From the Lyrics & Legends of Canada (2006), edited by Genevieve Kierans & Julie E. Czerneda
 "Nomad," Armored (2012), edited by John Joseph Adams
 "The Bleach," When the Villain Comes Home (2012), edited by Gabrielle Harbowy & Ed Greenwood
 "Enemy States," War Stories: New Military Science Fiction (2014), edited by Jaym Gates and Andrew Liptak

Awards
 Warner Aspect First Novel Award, 2002
 Prix Aurora Awards, Best Novel in English, 2006
 Gaylactic Spectrum Awards, Best Novel, 2006
Shortlisted for a 2018 Sunburst Award for Excellence in Canadian Literature of the Fantastic, for her short story Meridian.

See also
List of Canadian writers

References

External links
 Official site
 Interview at Clarkesworld Magazine September 2010
 Interview at SF Site
 Interview with Samantha Ling
 Interview

Living people
Canadian women novelists
Canadian science fiction writers
Place of birth missing (living people)
Canadian people of Guyanese descent
Women science fiction and fantasy writers
Year of birth missing (living people)